Hortense "Claudia" Bryar (née Rizley; May 18, 1918 – June 16, 2011) was an American actress. She is best known for portraying Emma Spool in the film Psycho II (1983).

Early years
Bryar was one of seven children of Ruby Elaine (née Seal) and Ross Rizley, a congressman and federal judge.

Career
Active from the 1950s to the 1980s, she is perhaps best known for her role as Mrs. Emma Spool in Psycho II (1983).

Bryar gained early acting experience with the Pasadena Playhouse. She played small parts in mostly Western television series such as Wanted Dead or Alive, Gunsmoke, Bonanza, and The Guns of Will Sonnett, plus sitcoms like The Real McCoys, The Bob Newhart Show, The Andy Griffith Show, Gomer Pyle, U.S.M.C., and The Twilight Zone (Episode: "Mute"). She had a small role in Leave It To Beaver episode “Community Chest” (5/13/1961). She had a small role in Dennis the Menace episode “Pythias Was a Piker” (1/29/1961).She appeared in small roles in such films as I Was A Teenage Frankenstein (1957) and Bad Company (1972). She appeared in made-for-TV movies such as The Family Nobody Wanted (1975) and Alexander: The Other Side of Dawn (1977). Her career ended with her role of Mrs. Prince in Hill Street Blues.

Personal life
Bryar was married to actor Paul Bryar (born Gabriel Paul Barrere) until his death in 1985. The couple had three children, including Paul Barrere, guitarist and singer with the rock band Little Feat. On June 16, 2011, Bryar died in Los Angeles at the age of 93.

Selected filmography

The Houston Story (1956) as Clara Phelan (uncredited)
Giant (1956) as Older Beauty Operator (uncredited)
The Wrong Man (1956) as Small Role (uncredited)
I Was A Teenage Frankenstein (1957) as Arlene's Mother
The True Story of Lynn Stuart (1958) as Nora Efron (uncredited)
Official Detective (1958, Episode: "The Deserted House") as Melissa Falcon
A Big Hand for the Little Lady (1966) as Mrs. Price (uncredited)
The Ride to Hangman's Tree (1967) as Mrs. Harmon
The Shakiest Gun in the West (1968) as Mrs. Remington (uncredited)
Angel in My Pocket (1969) as Mrs. Axel Gresham
Gaily, Gaily (1969) as Mother
Bad Company (1972) as Mrs. Clum
Ace Eli and Rodger of the Skies (1973) as Ann
Pat Garrett & Billy the Kid (1973) as Mrs. Horrell
Psycho II (1983) as Mrs. Emma Spool
Psycho III (1986) as Mrs. Emma Spool (flashback, uncredited)

References

External links
 
 Pictures of Claudia Bryar as Mrs. Emma Spool , Cinemorgue.com 
Obituary, latimes.com

1918 births
2011 deaths
American film actresses
American television actresses
American soap opera actresses
People from Guymon, Oklahoma
Actresses from Oklahoma
21st-century American women